The Boulevard was a multi-purpose stadium in Hull, England. The venue was saved from demolition and reopened on 25 October 2007 as the home of greyhound racing in the city. There were plans for it to be used as a community stadium hosting rugby league matches and speedway, but it eventually closed and was demolished in August 2010.

History 

In the past the ground was used mostly for rugby league matches and was the home stadium of Hull F.C. before the opening of KC Stadium. The main entrance was on Airlie Street, giving rise to Hull FC's nickname as 'the Airlie Birds'. When it closed, the stadium's capacity was 10,500 people. The Boulevard also hosted four matches in various Rugby League World Cups, as well as tour matches between Hull and visiting nations such as Australia and New Zealand. The ground had a strong connection with the city's former fishing industry being not far from Hessle Road.

The stadium has also been used for football with Hull City A.F.C. using the ground at times for their home matches.

In 1970, British League Division Two speedway returned to Hull for the first time since 1949 and proved to be exceedingly popular with large crowds cheering on the Hull Vikings each Wednesday. Hull had the dubious distinction of being the last league speedway team ever to appear at the famous West Ham Stadium, on 23 May 1972, when they beat the closing Hammers 40–38. Subsequent years saw their promotion to the first division and the inclusion of world champions Barry Briggs, Ivan Mauger and Egon Müller to ride for the team. Promotional changes, falling crowds and financial problems eventually saw the Vikings demise until their resurrection some years later at Hull's other rugby league and speedway stadium, Craven Park.

The Boulevard was also the host of the annual Yorkshire Television Trophy meeting during the 1970s, and early 1980s. With the British leagues home to not only the best British riders such as 1976 World Champion Peter Collins, 1980 World Champion Michael Lee, Dave Jessup and Malcolm Simmons, but also to many top class riders from around the world including World Champions Briggs, Mauger, Müller, Ole Olsen and Bruce Penhall, plus Billy Sanders, Dennis Sigalos, Shawn and Kelly Moran, and Phil Crump (the inaugural Yorkshire TV Trophy winner in 1974), the meetings often attracted fields which were as good in quality as many World Finals.

This saw the Boulevard have fast, almost 100 metre long straights and tight bends. The run off the corners onto the straights was narrow due to the fence not following the curve of the track but being straight from back in the turns.

The ground consisted of three stands, the most popular being the Threepenny stand, where the majority of singing and chanting occurred. It was given its name when the stadium opened as it was 3 old pence for entry. In July 1985, Hull's threepenny stand closed for safety reasons. A plaque was unveiled on the 'new' threepenny stand some years ago by STAND and Hull FC.

Greyhound racing

1927–1934
The stadium first hosted greyhound racing in 1927 when the Associated Greyhound Racecourses Ltd promoted a meeting on 2 July. The track was soon to be one of three greyhound stadiums operating in Hull after two more followed suit, within one year Craven Park stadium had opened and in 1934 the Craven Street track opened but the latter was short lived.

The football team moved out after finding a new home at Boothferry Park in August 1947 and the greyhound racing soon followed after coming to an end on 11 December 1948. Despite the Boulevard being considerably bigger than Craven Park the difference in popularity and tote turnover was significant.
In 1947 the tote turnover of Craven Park was £578,628 compared to the Boulevard's £23,263.

2003–2009

In 2003 Hull F.C. found a new ground at the KC Stadium joining up with the football team and putting the stadium under imminent threat of closure. Luckily the greyhound operation had just finished at the New Craven Park and transferred to the Boulevard saving the stadium from closure.
The track was constructed with a circumference of 387 metres and distances of 270, 460, 655 and 845 metres. Racing started in December 2003 with Friday and Saturday night racing under the supervision of Racing Manager, David Gray.

After the council refused to extend the greyhound racing lease the stadium remained unused until 25 October 2007 when it reopened again for the first time in 28 months. Racing changed to Thursday and Saturday nights and Mick Smith was brought in as Racing Manager.

Track records

Closure and demolition 
On 17 June 2009 it was announced that the Boulevard would close to greyhound racing once again after less than 2 years. After going to once a week racing, promoter Dave Marshall pulled the plug on funding for the stadium. On 22 August 2010, BBC Humberside reported that the stadium was in the process of being demolished after a council inspection due to safety concerns.

Rugby League Test Matches 
List of rugby league Test and World Cup matches played at the Boulevard.

Rugby League Tour Matches
Other than Hull F.C. club games, The Boulevard also saw Hull and the county team Yorkshire and a combined Hull F.C. and Hull Kingston Rovers XIII play host to international touring teams from Australia (sometimes playing as Australasia) and New Zealand from 1907 to 2002. New Zealand did play Hull F.C. as part of their 1980 tour of Great Britain and France, though that game was played at Boothferry Park.

References 

Defunct rugby league venues in England
Rugby League World Cup stadiums
Defunct football venues in England
Defunct speedway venues in England
Hull F.C.
Hull City A.F.C.
Sports venues in Kingston upon Hull
Defunct greyhound racing venues in the United Kingdom
Multi-purpose stadiums in the United Kingdom
Sports venues completed in 1895
Sports venues demolished in 2010
Demolished sports venues in the United Kingdom